Louella is a feminine given name which may refer to:

Louella Ballerino (1900–1978), American fashion designer
Louella Daetweiler (1918–2004), catcher in the All-American Girls Professional Baseball League
Louella D. Everett (1883–1967), American poet
Louella Parsons (1881–1972), American movie columnist
Louella Tomlinson (born 1988), Australian basketball player
 Louella Caraway Lee, character in seasons 2-4 of the original Dallas TV show
"Louella", a song by Pat Boone from his EP Four by Pat, 1957

English feminine given names